Cirque du Soleil ("Circus of the Sun" or "Sun Circus") is a Canadian entertainment company and the largest contemporary circus producer in the world. Located in the inner-city area of Saint-Michel, it was founded in Baie-Saint-Paul on 16 June 1984 by former street performers Guy Laliberté and Gilles Ste-Croix.

Originating as a performing troupe called Les Échassiers ("The Stilt Walkers"), they toured Quebec in various forms between 1979 and 1983. Their initial financial hardship was relieved in 1983 by a government grant from the Canada Council for the Arts to perform as part of the 450th anniversary celebrations of Jacques Cartier's voyage to Canada. Their first official production Le Grand Tour du Cirque du Soleil was a success in 1984, and after securing a second year of funding, Laliberté hired Guy Caron from the National Circus School to recreate it as a "proper circus". Its theatrical, character-driven approach and the absence of performing animals helped define Cirque du Soleil as the contemporary circus ("nouveau cirque") that it remains today.

After financial successes and failures in the late 1980s, Nouvelle Expérience was created—with the direction of Franco Dragone—which not only made Cirque du Soleil profitable by 1990, but allowed it to create new shows.

Cirque du Soleil expanded rapidly through the 1990s and 2000s, growing from one show to 19 shows in over 300 cities on six continents. The company employed 4,900 people from 50 countries and generated an annual revenue of approximately US$1 billion in 2017. The multiple permanent Las Vegas shows alone play to more than 9,000 people a night, 5% of the city's visitors, adding to the over 100 million people who have seen Cirque du Soleil productions worldwide.

In 2000, Laliberté bought out Daniel Gauthier, and with 95% ownership continued to expand the brand. In 2008, Laliberté split 20% of his share equally between the investment groups Istithmar World and Nakheel of Dubai in order to further finance the company's goals. In partnership with these two groups, Cirque du Soleil had planned to build a residency show in the United Arab Emirates in 2012 directed by Guy Caron and Michael Curry. However, following Dubai's financial problems in 2010 caused by the 2008 recession, Laliberté stated that the project had been "put on ice"; that he might be looking for another financial partner to bankroll the company's future plans; and that he might even consider giving up another 10% of his share in the company. In 2015, TPG Capital, Fosun Industrial Holdings, and Caisse de dépôt et placement du Québec purchased 90% of Cirque du Soleil while Laliberté retained a 10% stake in the company. The sale received regulatory approval from the Government of Canada on 30 June 2015. In February 2020, Laliberté sold his 10% ownership of the company to Caisse de dépôt et placement du Québec for $75 million.

The company's creations have received numerous prizes and distinctions, including three Drama Desk Awards; seven Primetime Emmy Awards; multiple Gemini Awards; a Daytime Emmy Award; a Juno Award; and a star on the Hollywood Walk of Fame. In 2000, Cirque du Soleil was awarded the National Arts Centre Award, a companion award of the Governor General's Performing Arts Awards, and in 2002 was inducted into Canada's Walk of Fame.

History

1979–1983: Origins 
In 1979, after having quit college and learned the art of fire breathing, Guy Laliberté organized a summer fair in Baie-Saint-Paul with the help of Daniel Gauthier and Gilles Ste-Croix. This gave them funding for the stilt-walking troupe Les Échassiers de Baie-Saint-Paul, which then toured Quebec the following year in 1980.

Although well received by audiences and critics alike, Les Échassiers was a financial failure. Laliberté spent the following winter in Hawaii while Ste-Croix stayed in Quebec to set up a nonprofit holding company named "The High-Heeled Club" (Club des Talons Hauts) to mitigate the losses of the previous summer. This allowed Les Échassiers de Baie-Saint-Paul to break even by fall 1981. The following summer, Laliberté and Ste-Croix founded La Fête Foraine, a street performance festival that featured circus performances and workshops to teach the circus arts to the public. Laliberté managed and produced the fair for 2 more years, becoming a moderate financial success.

In 1983, the government of Quebec gave him a $1.6 million grant to host a production the following year as part of Quebec's 450th anniversary celebration of the French explorer Jacques Cartier's arrival in Turtle Island (North America). This became Cirque du Soleil's first production Le Grand Tour du Cirque du Soleil.

1984–1989: Foundation and early productions 
The company's first production Le Grand Tour performed in Quebec for 13 weeks in summer 1984. Although several issues persisted during the first tour (including a collapsed tent and conflict between artists), it was a financial success. After securing funding from the Canadian government for a second year from the help of Quebec premier René Lévesque, Laliberté hired Guy Caron, head of the National Circus School, as Cirque du Soleil's artistic director. Laliberté and Caron reworked the company's performance style to emulate that of Moscow Circus by having the acts tell a story. Further influences from the Circus of China, Cirque Arlette Gruss, and Circus Roncalli led Cirque du Soleil to approach their shows in a more theatrical fashion with live music and no technical crew on stage. To assist in this shift towards a theatrical production, Laliberté and Caron hired Belgian director Franco Dragone to direct segments of their 1985 production, Cirque du Soleil.

The company's first non-Quebec performances in Ontario in 1985 were unsuccessful, leading to a $750,000 deficit. To allow a 1986 tour to mount, the Desjardins Group covered $200,000 of bad checks, financier Daniel Lamarre represented the company for free, and the Quebec government allotted it an additional year of funding. La Magie Continue, their 1986 production, proved more artistically successful with the direction of Franco Dragone. This extended to the creation of their 1987 show Le Cirque Réinventé.

In the summer of 1987, Cirque du Soleil was invited to present Le Cirque Réinventé at the Los Angeles Arts Festival. Despite only having enough money to make a one-way trip, the company agreed to open for the festival in September of that year. Le Cirque Réinventé's first American performances were an instant critical and financial hit, allowing them make a profit of over $1.5 million by the end of 1987. The show continued to tour Canada and the United States throughout 1988 and 1989, during which time plans for a second touring show named Éclipse started being developed. Due to artistic differences with these plans, Guy Caron, along with a number of artists, left the company causing the plans to be shelved. Gilles Ste-Croix, who had been away from the company since 1985, subsequently replaced Caron as artistic director.

1990–1999: Expansion 
By the end of 1989, the company once again faced deficit due to internal conflicts amongst the company's leaders as well as from lukewarm reception to their revamped tour of Le Cirque Réinventé in the United States. In response to this, Cirque du Soleil took their plans for their previously shelved show Éclipse and developed it into Nouvelle Expérience. Franco Dragone returned as director in addition to a creative team made up of Dominique Lemieux, Michel Crête, René Dupéré, Luc Lafortune, and Debra Brown. Nouvelle Expérience premiered on 8 May 1990 in Montreal to critical acclaim, touring North America through the end of 1991 and later residing in Las Vegas in 1992 and 1993. Their following touring shows — Saltimbanco, Alegría, Quidam, and Dralion — proved to be equally successful.

The success of Nouvelle Expérience's contract in Las Vegas led to a deal between Cirque du Soleil and the Mirage Casino-Hotel to create a permanent show, Mystère, residing in Treasure Island Hotel and Casino on the Las Vegas Strip. It premiered in December 1993. Its success as the company's first permanent production would later allow for the creation of two more permanent shows in 1998: O in Las Vegas and La Nouba at Walt Disney World in Orlando, Florida. During this time of expansion the company also founded their International Headquarters in Montreal's Saint-Michel neighbourhood and their multimedia division, Cirque du Soleil Images. In 1999 they premiered their film Alegría, also directed by Dragone.

Following the premiere of La Nouba in 1998, the creative team that had developed all of the company's shows from Nouvelle Expérience to La Nouba left. Starting with the creation of Dralion in 1999, Cirque du Soleil began producing shows with entirely new creative teams.

First international ventures 
Le Cirque Réinventé marked the company's first performances outside of North America when it performed in London and Paris in 1990. The show received a mixed reception and was not followed by another production until Saltimbanco's 1995 European tour, which better solidified Cirque du Soleil's presence in the European market.

Cirque du Soleil also toured Japan in the summer of 1992 at the behest of the Fuji Television Network. Combining acts from their previous shows Nouvelle Expérience and Le Cirque Réinventé, they created their first arena show Fascination which toured Japan from May to August of that year. Fascination's positive reception allowed Cirque du Soleil to play Saltimbanco there in 1994, thereby establishing the company's market in the Asia and Pacific region for their subsequent tours in the late 1990s and 2000s.

2000–2009: Rapid growth 
In 2000, the company produced their IMAX film Journey of Man. Shortly afterwards, at the beginning of 2001, Daniel Gauthier left the company and was bought out by Guy Laliberté, bringing his ownership stake in the company to 95%. Gilles Ste-Croix also soon left to found the horse-based touring show Cheval, leading Laliberté to hire Lyn Heward and Daniel Lamarre as Presidents and C.O.O.'s of the company's Creative Content and New Ventures divisions, respectively.

In 2002, the company created the touring show Varekai and in 2003 premiered the resident show Zumanity in Las Vegas, their first "X-rated" show performed only for adults aged 18 years and older.

In 2003, the company also produced their first television shows: the documentary reality miniseries Fire Within and the variety series Solstrom.

In 2004, Cirque du Soleil premiered the resident show Kà at MGM Grand in Las Vegas, directed by Robert Lepage. In September of that year, the company launched their record label, Cirque du Soleil Musique, after their agreement with BMG Canada expired.

In 2005, Lamarre took over as President of Cirque du Soleil from Laliberté while Heward took on the role of executive producer for special projects. In that same year the company premiered the touring show Corteo. The same year, the Cirque du Soleil switched ticketing companies to go with Outbox's technology, a white label system, of which it also became a shareholder.

Cirque du Soleil premiered two shows in 2006: Delirium, their first significant touring arena show, in January of that year and The Beatles Love, their first collaboration with The Beatles, in June. Similarly, in 2007 they opened two more productions with the resident show Wintuk in New York City and the touring tent show Koozå. In July 2007 the company made their first effort to convert tent shows to arena settings by launching Saltimbanco's arena tour in London, Ontario (this custom would be followed by other tent shows in later years).

The company opened three resident shows within the span of 3 months in 2008 — Zaia in Macau, China, Criss Angel Believe in Las Vegas, and Zed in Tokyo, Japan — which furthered their practice of producing multiple shows at the same time. That year Cirque du Soleil also announced that they sold a 20% stake in the company to Dubai investors Istithmar World and Nakheel in order to finance their goals, which included creating a permanent show in Dubai.

In 2009, they launched 3 more shows: the touring tent show Ovo, the touring theatre show Banana Shpeel, and the resident show Viva Elvis in Las Vegas. At this time Cirque du Soleil began being criticized for the quality of their productions. Banana Shpeel became labelled as one of the company's first "failures" when it was panned by both critics and audiences; Criss Angel Believe and Viva Elvis also received negative reviews.

[[File:Cirque du Soleil in Santiago, Chile; 2016.jpg|thumb|Koozås grand chapiteau in Santiago, Chile|245x245px]]

 2010–2015: Cutbacks and restructuring 
The touring show Totem premiered in 2010 and was soon followed by three more shows in 2011: the resident show Iris in Los Angeles and the touring shows Michael Jackson: The Immortal World Tour and Zarkana. Although the company was still growing at this time, it continued to face several issues with its newer productions. Zarkana and Michael Jackson: The Immortal World Tour received poor reviews and the company had a string of closures. Banana Shpeel closed in Toronto in October 2010 after cancelling its previously-announced engagement in San Francisco. In July 2011, Cirque du Soleil announced the closure of Zed due to poor ticket sales as a direct result of the March 2011 Tōhoku earthquake and tsunami. In November 2011 MGM Grand asked the company to close and replace Viva Elvis by the end of 2012 due to poor ticket sales. In February 2012, the company announced the closure of Zaia due to disappointing ticket sales and in November 2012, despite critical praise, announced the closure of Iris, also due to low ticket sales. In December 2012, the company announced a new division — Cirque du Soleil Média — in conjunction with Bell Media, followed by the release of their second film Worlds Away. At this time Cirque du Soleil also announced 50 layoffs. The layoffs consisted mostly of 30 employee positions at their International Headquarters in Montreal, including three vice-presidents.

With the high output of shows between 2007 and 2011 in combination with its multiple closures, the company began slowing down its operations. In 2012 and 2013 it only opened two shows: the touring tent show Amaluna and the resident show Michael Jackson: One in Las Vegas. On 16 January 2013, Cirque du Soleil announced that it would be laying off 400 of its 5000 employees worldwide, most of which at their International Headquarters. The company noted that it had not been profitable in 2012 despite having garnered over $1 billion in revenue that year. Later that year, on 30 June 2013, the company faced headlines when acrobat Sarah "Sasoun" Guyard-Guillot died after falling during a performance of Kà in Las Vegas, its first on-stage death in its history.

In January 2014, Cirque du Soleil announced the creation of Cirque du Soleil Theatrical, a division aimed developing more traditional theatre productions in order to diversify their production output. The company subsequently announced numerous subsidiaries in addition to its Theatrical division, including the Sandbox Hospitality Group, 45 Degrees, 4U2C, and Outbox Enterprises. In April 2014, Kurios: Cabinet of Curiosities, a touring tent show, premiered in Montreal to critical acclaim and was followed in November 2014 by Joyà, both the company's first resident show in Mexico and their first dinner theatre production.

On 20 April 2015, Guy Laliberté announced that he had sold a 90% joint stake in the company to the investment groups TPG Capital, Fosun Capital Group, and La Caisse de dépôt et placement du Québec for approximately $1.5 billion, while retaining a 10% stake in the company himself. Under the new ownership, the company began majorly restructuring its executive leadership in order to focus on increasing their profitability. Their finance director, chief operating officer, and numerous vice-presidents were all replaced within six months of the company's sale. Most notably, the position of Chief Operating Officer held by Charles Décarie was given to finance lawyer Jonathan Tétrault. Stéphane Lefebvre would later come into the position of Chief Financial Officer.

 2015–2020: Rebranding and diversification 
In November 2015 the company premiered the touring arena show Toruk — The First Flight based on James Cameron's Avatar franchise.

It was followed shortly after by the touring tent show Luzia and the company's first Broadway musical Paramour, both opening in April 2016. By the end of 2016 the company had also launched the preschool television series Luna Petunia on Netflix.

In 2017, it launched three more productions. Séptimo Día — No Descansaré, an arena show based on the music of Soda Stereo, premiered in March for a short year-long tour targeted largely at South and Central American audiences. In April 2017, it premiered the touring tent show Volta and in October, Crystal, the company's first ice show.

Under the ownership of TPG Capital, Fosun Capital Group, and La Caisse de dépôt et placement du Québec, Cirque du Soleil took steps to diversify and rebrand the company. On 6 July 2017, Cirque du Soleil announced that it had acquired the Blue Man Group as a new subsidiary of the company. It was reportedly bought for US$65.5 million. On 21 November 2017, the company released a video on all of its social media platforms titled "New Icons for a New Era" where it revealed new logos and announced the Cirque du Soleil Entertainment Group as the name of the organization's new umbrella company.

On 25 April 2018, the company announced that 45 Degrees, their special events subsidiary, had taken over the main company's creation and production department. On 5 July 2018, they announced their acquisition of the children's entertainment company VStar Entertainment Group and its subsidiary Cirque Dreams. Cirque du Soleil launched the children's show Big Top Academy through TVO in October 2018. In November 2018, it premiered the touring tent show Bazzar in India, the company's first production to tour in that region. In 2019, the company opened six shows: the touring tent show Alegría: In a New Light; the touring arena shows Axel and Messi10; and three resident shows — X: The Land of Fantasy in Hangzhou, China, R.U.N in Las Vegas, and 'Twas the Night Before in New York City. During this time Cirque du Soleil also acquired The Works Entertainment company for $40 million to further diversify its subsidiaries.

In February 2020, Caisse de dépôt et placement du Québec announced that it had acquired Guy Laliberté's 10% stake in Cirque du Soleil, bringing its total ownership in the company from 10% to 20%.

 2020–2021: Impact of the COVID-19 pandemic 
On 19 March 2020, responding to the COVID-19 pandemic, Cirque du Soleil announced that all 44 active shows worldwide would be suspended, and that 4,679 employees, comprising 95 percent of their staff, would be temporarily laid off, effective immediately. These actions brought the company into a state of financial collapse with a debt of over $1 billion. Although it received financial support with a $50 million injection from its shareholders and a $200 million loan from the Quebec government, on 29 June 2020, the company announced that it had filed for bankruptcy protection and was terminating 3,500 employees who had previously been laid off. CEO Daniel Lamarre stated the intention of the company was to rehire "a substantial majority" of terminated employees once coronavirus-related shutdowns were lifted and operations could resume, business conditions allowing. In connection with the filing, Cirque du Soleil entered a stalking horse bid from its shareholders with the intention of drawing outside bidders to buy the company. In July 2020, the company's shareholders offered a proposal that would allow its creditors to obtain a 45% stake in the company while the current shareholders would maintain a 55% shared stake. On 17 July 2020, a takeover proposal by the company's creditors valued at US$1.2 billion was approved as a benchmark bid in the company by the Quebec Superior Court. On 17 August 2020, Caisse de dépôt et placement du Québec reported that it had to write off the US$75 million investment which it had made only four months prior, in February.

On 24 November 2020, it was announced that the company emerged from bankruptcy and was sold to former MGM Resorts International CEO Jim Murren and Canadian investment company Catalyst Capital.

In January 2021, the company's previously announced 2021 production Nysa was cancelled as a direct result of the pandemic.

 2021–present: Emergence from the COVID-19 pandemic 
With the exception of the resident shows Joyà and X: The Land of Fantasy, which reopened with limited capacities in the summer of 2020, Cirque du Soleil did not reopen its shows for over a year following its worldwide COVID-19 performance suspension in March 2020. In the summer of 2021, the company began gradually reopening several of its shows, beginning with all its Las Vegas-based resident shows (with the exception of Zumanity, which permanently shut down in November 2020) and some of its touring shows in late 2021 and 2022. However, some touring shows that had been temporarily suspended due to the pandemic were retroactively permanently closed at this time, including Totem, Volta, and Axel.

In November 2021, the resident show Drawn to Life premiered — the company's first new production since the start of the pandemic.

On 30 November 2021, Cirque du Soleil announced that Daniel Lamarre would be stepping down as president and CEO of the company and transitioning into the role of executive vice-chairman of the board, while former chief financial officer and chief operating officer Stéphane Lefebvre would take over as president and CEO, effective 1 December 2021.

 Shows 

Each Cirque du Soleil production is a synthesis of circus styles from around the world, with its own central theme and storyline. Shows employ continuous live music, with performers rather than stagehands changing the props.

The duration of each touring show is typically between 2 and 2 hours and 30 minutes, including an intermission. Permanent shows are usually between 70 and 90 minutes in length without an intermission. Typically touring shows as well as resident shows perform a standard 10 shows a week. Touring shows usually have one "dark day" (with no performances) while resident shows have two.

 Show list 

 Future productions 
 Echo: In October 2019, Cirque du Soleil announced the creation of the tent production Under the Same Sky with Es Devlin as director, writer, and set designer. Originally set to premiere in Montreal in April 2020, it was postponed due to the COVID-19 pandemic. In October 2022, the company announced that the show will premiere in April 2023 under the new title Echo, with Mukhtar Omar Sharif Mukhtar taking over as director from Es Devlin.
 Nuevo Vallarta resident show: In November 2019, Grupo Vidanta and Cirque du Soleil announced the creation of a second dinner theatre resident show in Mexico, performed in a specially designed 600-seat theatre in Nuevo Vallarta.

 Areas of activity 
With the intent of diversifying its activities worldwide, the Cirque du Soleil has created subsidiaries, such as multimedia environments and ticket selling tools.

Outbox Technology
Outbox was built around the idea that event producers need a white label system to support them in selling tickets directly to customers. It allows all live entertainment venues to control their inventory, pricing, and consumer data without any third party involvement.

4U2C
4U2C creates multimedia visual environments that combine video, sound, lighting and special effects for a variety of projection surfaces.

45 Degrees
45 Degrees produces custom-made experiential content for clients who are seeking high-end creative services for their events.

 Other works 

ProjectsCirque du Monde: A social action project founded in 1994 designed to reach marginalized youth nationally and internationally by teaching circus arts and skills.One Drop: In 2007, Cirque du Soleil founded One Drop, a charitable project designed to bring clean water to developing countries.Jukari Fit to Fly: Cirque du Soleil collaborated with Reebok in 2009 to create a gym workout set based on trapeze work.
 Safewalls: An artistic outreach project in which urban street artists were hired to create visual artworks for the company in 2011.
 Desigual inspired by Cirque du Soleil: Cirque du Soleil partnered with Desigual fashion design in 2011 to develop a collection of clothing and accessories, which were made available at Desigual stores and Cirque du Soleil show boutiques. The partnership was discontinued in 2015.
 Movi.Kanti.Revo: In association with Google, Cirque du Soleil released a Google Chrome extension in 2012.Felix & Paul Studios VR: Between 2014 and 2017, the Cirque du Soleil Média collaborated with Felix & Paul Studios to create a number of virtual reality videos based on Zarkana, Kurios, Kà, O, and Luzia. Inside the Box of Kurios later won a Daytime Emmy Award in 2016.Cirque du Soleil Theme Park: On 12 November 2014, Cirque du Soleil, Grupo Vidanta, and Goddard Group announced plans for a theme park in Nuevo Vallarta, Mexico. The plans called for at least two lands, the Village of the Sun and the Village of the Moon, as well as an outdoor evening show accommodating as many as 3,000 to 5,000 spectators, and may include a water park and nature park elements. The opening was initially delayed from 2018 to a mid-2019 opening. Further delays have subsequently pushed the projected opening date to 2023.One Night for One Drop''': From 2013 to 2019, Cirque du Soleil organized an annual one-night event in support of the clean water charity One Drop.

 Cirque du Soleil Events + Experiences 

From the 1990s until 2015, Cirque du Soleil produced a variety of public and private events and performances under its Special Events division. In April 2015, the company announced that its Special Events division formed a subsidiary company called 45 Degrees. Led by Yasmine Khalil, the new company continued to produce special events for Cirque du Soleil while expanding to offer creative content outside Cirque du Soleil as well. 45 Degrees later merged with the C-Lab (creative laboratory) division of the main company, continuing to produce special event performances while also designing shows with new concepts (such as the dinner-show concept in Joyà and the ice concept in Crystal). In April 2019, Cirque du Soleil announced that the 45 Degrees subsidiary had become a division named "Cirque du Soleil Events + Experiences" under which the company now develops its special events and projects.

 Notable special events 

 Cruise ship performances 

 Collaboration with Celebrity Cruises 
In March 2004, Celebrity Cruises announced its first collaboration with Cirque du Soleil. By the end of that year, the collaboration had launched "The Bar at the Edge of the Earth" on both the Constellation and Summit cruise ships, a bar and lounge inspired by Cirque du Soleil featuring live characters and projections. However, due to lukewarm reception, Celebrity Cruises announced in October 2005 that it would be removing the live characters and projections from the lounges and retooling its Cirque du Soleil offering so as to create a more standard circus performance. In December 2005, the collaboration premiered the 30-minute acrobatic show A Taste of Cirque du Soleil on both ships. It continued through 2006 and was eventually discontinued.

 Cirque du Soleil at Sea 
On 9 November 2015, Cirque du Soleil announced that it would be re-entering the cruise ship business in collaboration with MSC Cruises. The partnership plans included a $21 million investment by MSC to create special theatre spaces in four of their Meraviglia class ships while Cirque du Soleil would create eight new shows, two on each ship in alternating performances. The partnership was later branded as Cirque du Soleil at Sea.

In June 2017, it launched its first two productions on the MSC Meraviglia — Viaggio and Sonor. This was followed by Syma and Varélia on the MSC Bellissima in March 2019 and Cosmos and Exentricks on the MSC Grandiosa in November 2019. Two more shows were planned to launch on MSC Virtuosa in 2020 until the COVID-19 pandemic forced all Cirque du Soleil at Sea productions to close.

Lounges and nightclubs
Following the opening of The Beatles Love in Las Vegas in June 2006, Cirque du Soleil opened the Revolution lounge at The Mirage resort in 2007, its first venture into the Las Vegas nightlife business. The lounge was based on the work of The Beatles, in conjunction with the concept of The Beatles Love. In 2009, the company opened the Gold Lounge at the Aria Resort and Casino based on the life of Elvis Presley and their show Viva Elvis. In May 2013 the Light Group opened the Light nightclub in collaboration with Cirque du Soleil at the Mandalay Bay Hotel and Casino in concurrence with the premiere of Michael Jackson One. It would later be host to the musical For the Record, the company's first project out of its theatrical division.

In October 2015, Cirque du Soleil renounced its intention to be involved in Las Vegas nightclubs and has since dissociated itself from all its lounges and clubs. Both the Revolution and Gold Lounges closed in 2015 while the Light nightclub is no longer affiliated with the company.

Luna Petunia
In 2014 Cirque du Soleil Média and Saban Brands produced Luna Petunia, an animated series for preschool-aged children. It began airing on Netflix in September 2016. On 1 May 2018, Saban Brands sold Luna Petunia to Hasbro.

The Wiz
In a collaboration with Universal Television and Sony Pictures Television, the Cirque du Soleil Theatrical division co-produced the television broadcast of The Wiz Live! (based on the musical of the same name) which aired in December 2015 on NBC. Tony Award-winning director Kenny Leon directed the show along with Broadway writer/actor Harvey Fierstein, who contributed new material to the original Broadway script. Queen Latifah, Mary J. Blige, Stephanie Mills, Ne-Yo, David Alan Grier, Common, Elijah Kelley, Amber Riley, and Uzo Aduba and Shanice Williams starred in the broadcast. It was speculated that a live version of the show would play on Broadway during the 2016–2017 season, however this plan fell through.

Tours
[[File:Circo del Sol.JPG|thumb|275px|alt=Cirque du Soleil's grand chapiteau at night|Night shot of Quidam's grand chapiteau in Barcelona, Spain]]
Cirque du Soleil shows normally tour under a grand chapiteau (i.e. big top) for an extended period of time until they are modified, if necessary, for touring in arenas and other venues. It typically takes 8 days to set up the tent site with approximately 100 local citizens hired as temporary staff overseen by one of the company's tent masters. Contrarily, it takes 3 days to deconstruct the entire site. The infrastructure that tours with each show includes the Grand Chapiteau, a large entrance tent, artistic tent, kitchen, school, and other items necessary to support the cast and crew.

Prior to 2006, Cirque du Soleil performed exclusively in tents and permanent theatres, with the exception of the brief arena tours of Le Grand Tour du Cirque du Soleil and Fascination in 1984 and 1992, respectively. Delirium marked the company's first significant touring show for the arena market in 2006. With Delirium's success, Cirque du Soleil began the practice of re-staging its Grand Chapiteau shows for arena tours, beginning with Saltimbanco in 2007 and subsequently occurring with most of their major Grand Chapiteau productions.

The company's tours have significant financial impacts on the cities they visit by renting lots for shows, parking spaces, selling and buying promotions, and contributing to the local economy with hotel stays, purchasing food, and hiring local help. For example, during its stay in Santa Monica, California, Koozå brought an estimated  to the city government and local businesses.

 Discography 

 Filmography 
The company's multimedia division Cirque du Soleil Images creates original products for film, television, video, and DVD and distributes its productions worldwide. Its creations have garnered numerous awards, including a multiple Gemini Awards and seven Primetime Emmy Awards for Fire Within, Corteo, Dralion, Nouvelle Expérience, and Le Cirque Réinventé.

 Controversies and legal issues 

Firing of HIV-positive artist
In November 2003, gymnast Matthew Cusick (represented by the Lambda Legal Defense and Education Fund) filed a discrimination complaint against Cirque du Soleil in the Equal Employment Opportunity Commission, alleging a violation of the Americans With Disabilities Act.Sarah Kaufman, Fired by Cirque du Soleil, Matthew Cusick Landed on His Feet , Washington Post (13 September 2011). Cusick (a trainee performer who was scheduled to begin working at Mystère) alleged that in April 2002, Cirque du Soleil fired him because he tested HIV-positive, even though company doctors had already cleared him as healthy enough to perform. Cirque du Soleil alleged that due to the nature of Cusick's disease coupled with his job's high risk of injury, there was a significant risk of his infecting other performers, crew or audience members.  Cirque du Soleil said that they had several HIV-positive employees, but in the case of Cusick, the risk of him spreading his infection while performing was too high to take the risk. A boycott ensued and Just Out ran a story on it with the headline "Flipping off the Cirque". Cirque du Soleil settled with Cusick in April 2004. Under the settlement, the company began a company-wide anti-discrimination training program; changed its employment practices pertaining to HIV-positive applicants; paid Cusick $60,000 in lost wages, $200,000 in front pay, and $300,000 in compensatory damages; and paid $40,000 in attorney fees to Lambda Legal.

An additional complaint was filed on Cusick's behalf by the San Francisco Human Rights Commission. Their complaint stemmed from the City of San Francisco's ban on city contracting with employers that discriminate based on HIV status; the circus leases property owned by the city-owned Port of San Francisco.

Trademark and copyright disputes
Cirque du Soleil opposed Neil Goldberg and his company Cirque Productions over its use of the word "Cirque" in the late 1990s. Goldberg's company was awarded a trademark on its name "Cirque Dreams" in 2005.

In August 1999, Fremonster Theatrical filed an application for the trademark Cirque de Flambé. This application was opposed by the owners of the Cirque du Soleil trademark in August 2002, on the grounds that it would cause confusion and "[dilute] the distinctive quality" of Cirque du Soleil's trademarks. A judge dismissed the opposition and the Cirque de Flambé trademark application was approved in 2005.

In April 2016, Cirque du Soleil filed a copyright infringement lawsuit against Justin Timberlake, Timbaland, and Sony Music Entertainment in federal court in New York, alleging that Timberlake's song "Don't Hold the Wall" (co-written with Timbaland) from his third studio album The 20/20 Experience (2013) infringed the copyright of Cirque du Soleil's song "Steel Dream" from its 1997 album Quidam.

H.B. 2 law in North Carolina
In 2016 the company cancelled of all touring shows to North Carolina, including Ovo in both Greensboro and Charlotte, and Toruk in Raleigh, following signature of the Public Facilities Privacy & Security Act (commonly known as "HB2") by North Carolina governor Pat McCrory. Cirque du Soleil was criticized for this decision and accused of taking a double standard, for cancelling the shows in North Carolina while many times they have performed their shows in countries like the United Arab Emirates which violates a number of fundamental human rights.

Fatalities
On 16 October 2009, 24-year-old performer Oleksandr "Sacha" Zhurov, of Ukraine, died at a hospital in Montreal, Quebec, Canada, from head injuries he had sustained during a training session. He had been with the company only a few months at the time of the accident. An initial report of the incident said Zhurov had fallen off a trampoline but, in 2010, it was reported he had fallen while doing training exercises on a Russian swing. An investigation by Quebec's occupational-safety board decided that while Zhurov made the error that ultimately resulted in his death, the company should be fined $1,915 for failing to adequately determine the risks associated with equipment.

On 29 June 2013, 31-year-old performer Sarah "Sasoun" Guyard-Guillot, of France, died in an ambulance en route to hospital as the result of blunt force trauma she had sustained from a fall during a performance of Kà in Las Vegas, Nevada. She'd been with the company since 2006. It was originally thought that Guyard-Guillot's safety harness had failed her and that was what resulted in her fall but, in actuality, a cable responsible for keeping her in the air had been cut after accidentally being knocked loose by movement during the performance. Reports as to how far Guyard-Guillot fell differ from source to source, with some saying she fell as little as 50 feet and others as much as 94 feet. The show resumed 17 days after the death without the final aerial battle scene. The company was fined as a result.

On 29 November 2016, 42-year-old set technician Olivier Rochette, of Canada, died in San Francisco, California, from head injuries he had sustained after accidentally being hit in the head by an aerial lift while preparing for a production of Luzia. Rochette was the son of Cirque du Soleil co-founder Gilles Ste-Croix.

On 17 March 2018, 38-year-old aerial straps performer Yann Arnaud, of France, died at a hospital in Tampa, Florida, after falling during a performance of Volta''. He had been with the company for 15 years.

Notable people 
 

Mathieu Laplante, producer, director, choreographer, and former circus performer

Notes

References

External links 

 
 
 The Cirque: An American Odyssey, documentary film about Cirque du Soleil's 1988 U.S. tour, National Film Board of Canada

 
1984 establishments in Quebec
Buskers
Circuses
Companies based in Montreal
Canadian companies established in 1984
Entertainment companies of Canada
Entertainment companies established in 1984
Governor General's Performing Arts Award winners
Performing groups established in 1984
Privately held companies of Canada
Companies that have filed for bankruptcy in Canada
Companies that filed for Chapter 11 bankruptcy in 2020